Bourne Field was a US Marine Corps Air Facility (MCAF) located on St. Thomas, a part of the US Virgin Islands. Throughout its service, it was known as Navy Operating Base, St. Thomas, MCAS St. Thomas, and MCAF St. Thomas, Virgin Islands. The previously civilian airstrip was acquired by the US government and operated as a military base between 1935 and 1948 before it was returned to civilian use.

History 
The airstrip was located in a swamp 5 miles from Charlotte-Amalie on St. Thomas, an island apart of the US Virgin Islands and located within the West Indies. Originally known as Mosquito Bay, the field was the first airport to service the island of St. Thomas, with the first passengers arriving in 1928.

The airstrip was taken over by the US government on September 1, 1935 and renamed Bourne Field, after Major Louis T. Bourne, the first person to fly non-stop from the United States to Nicaragua. It served as a training airstrip for the US Marine Corps, originally made up of two 1,600-foot (490 m) long unpaved runways. Assigned to Bourne was the VO-9M observation squadron, apart of Aircraft One of the United States Fleet Marine Forces. In 1936, the squadron was re-designated as VMS-3 (Marine Scouting Squadron 3), operating the Vought SU-2 Corsair.

On 30 October 1939 the US Navy awarded a contract for the development of San Juan, Puerto Rico, which initially included 44 individual projects. Over the next few years, the contract would include the construction of Isla Grande Naval Air Station and various supporting facilities, such as a hospital and administrative buildings. In July 1940, the contract was updated to include the expansion of Bourne and the two other military installations on St. Thomas, those being a radio station and a submarine base. The contract called for Bourne to be able to service a permanent 18-plane Marine squadron and an additional patrol-plane squadron serviced through tender ships in nearby Lindbergh Bay. To support seaplanes, a hangar, ramp, and equipment shop were built. By the end of the year, 140 US Marines were stationed at the base, and construction costs topped $2 million. On 1 December 1941, the base was renamed MCAF (Marine Corps Air Facility) St. Thomas, Virgin Islands.

Following a review of the various construction projects, the US Navy changed the requirements of the contract and required additional work to be done at Bourne which would allow it to operate two Marine squadrons and 6 patrol seaplanes. More barracks, stores, and other crew facilities were added to the contract to support the larger amount of aircraft. By the end of construction, Bourne hosted 4 barracks, which provided living space for 740 personnel, in addition to 74 housing units. In 1942, the contract was updated for the last time regarding the field. The long runway was paved, and oil tanks were added with the capacity for 100,000 gallons of gasoline and 135,000 barrels of diesel. On 4 March 1943 the air station was merged with the nearby Navy Operating Base, St. Thomas, and redesignated as such.

On 11 June 1943 the 260-man strong Construction Battalion Maintenance Unit 507 arrived on the island to supplement the civilian contractors. The contract was canceled on 26 June, leaving the Navy to finish construction and maintenance of the base. On 1 July 1944, The base was redesignated as MCAS (Marine Corps Air Station) St. Thomas, merging with the nearby seaplane base at Lindbergh Bay and an emergency runway on Anguilla Island.

At the start of the war, VMS-3 (nicknamed the Devilbirds) operated the J2F-A Duck utility aircraft, which was replaced by the OS2N-1 Kingfisher in 1942; the Kingfisher was then in turn replaced by the SBD scout dive-bomber in 1944. In May 1944, the unit was deactivated. The purpose of the squadron was to maintain an anti-submarine patrol between Puerto Rico and Martinique, however the diminishing activity of German U-boats made the base redundant.

In June 1944, most of the base's supplies were relocated to the Pacific, where there was a greater demand for equipment. By 1946, the facility was designated as "caretaker status" and operations were handed over to airlines for civilian service. The base was redesignated for the last time as MCAF St. Thomas, Virgin Islands on 8 August 1947. The base was decommissioned on February 16, 1948. Following the closure of the base, the airport was leased to the US Department of the Interior for civilian use. However, the Navy reserved the power to reactivate the airport for military purposes. After the transfer, the former hanger was converted into the civilian terminal and named after President Harry S. Truman. The airport now operates as the Cyril E. King Airport, a civilian facility servicing St. Thomas.

On 25 March 1950 the Department of the Interior leased the land to the Virgin Islands. However, the department canceled the lease on 1 July 1954 citing violations of the agreement. According to the department, the Virgin Islands failed to register and report financial transactions relating to the land. As a result of the cancellation, the property was given to the US Virgin Islands Corporation.

Commanding Officers 
List of commanding officers which lead Bourne Field.

Gallery

References 

Saint Thomas, U.S. Virgin Islands